Valley RFC is a sports club based in Hong Kong with a rugby section ( known as Societe Generale Valley RFC for sponsorship reasons) as well as Netball and Hockey sections. It also has a junior rugby academy called Valley Fort. The club is historically based in Happy Valley, Hong Kong, inside the Happy Valley Racecourse, hence the inspiration for its logo, the Knight chess piece.

History 
Valley RFC also known as Valley was founded in 1975 by a group of ex-members of the Royal Hong Kong Police Rugby Club, some displaced individuals and schoolboys who joined forces to enter a team in the local rugby competition. The result was Valley RFC, so named because of its home in Happy Valley. Valley's men of rugby have been running out in Black and Red for the past 27 seasons and have been the most successful domestic rugby side in recent years. The 2,000-capacity Happy Valley Racecourse stadium is their rugby union home.

Rugby

Men's Rugby 
Valley is the most successful Rugby Club in Hong Kong and has won trophies at all levels of competition over the past 30 years. In recent years, the Premiership team has won back to back championships and grand finals. From 2013-2018 the premiership team had a winning streak of 6 Grand Championships in a row - still a record as of 2021 - along with 2 League victories over that time - 2015/16 and 2016/17. In 2009 Valley had an unbeaten season with wins in the league and Grand Championship!
In the 2002/03 seasons Valley first team went undefeated for 16 consecutive matches taking out the League and then the Grand Championship. In the same season, the coach and captain were awarded by the HKRFU with the Coach of the Year and the Player of the Year respectively. The Top Try Scorer award also went to a Valley player, Alex Telea, with a record 25 tries. A number of Valley players represent the Hong Kong National team In recent years two Valley players have moved on to play in the Super 12 tournament in the southern hemisphere and several have moved into the National First Divisions in European teams. Keith Lowen played for Valley RFC in 1999, and went on to represent the New Zealand All Blacks in 2002. In the 2002/03 seasons, two ex-Super Rugby12 players, Matthew Dowling and Alex Telea,  represented Valley at Club level, raising the levels of experience and talent throughout the club. Valley has a long-standing rivalry with the neighbour Hong Kong Football Club known as the Valley derby. Valley holds the record for most consecutive Grand Championship wins with six in a row as of March 2018

Ladies' Rugby 
Valley Ladies (The Pink Ladies) was formed in 1996 as part of the development of women's rugby in Hong Kong. Ladies rugby in Hong Kong has evolved over the years from 7's rugby, 10-a-side rugby to the first season of 15's rugby being played in 2002–2003. At the time Valley couldn't field a women's 15's side, however they did continue in the ladies 7's league. They are supported by the same coaches and levels of expertise available to the men's section. Off the field and off-season they are as active with touch and tag rugby and Dragon Boating where this year The Pink Ladies Dragon Boating squad won the plate winners narrowly beating the Hockey section Avalon Maidens.

Youth Rugby (Valley Fort RFC) 
In 2002 Valley RFC re-established links with Stanley Fort RFC so that it could build a better framework to cater for more youth sides and to help provide young rugby players with a seamless path from junior to senior rugby. In 2004, to enhance the affiliation with Valley RFC, Stanley Fort changed its name to Valley Fort RFC and now plays in black and red (following the senior team strip). Valley Fort is one of the larger mini-rugby clubs in Hong Kong and has over 700 registered players in its mini and colt sections. The club runs a number of teams at all age groups from Under 5's to Under 19s.

Hockey 
Comprising five Men's teams and five Ladies' teams, the hockey section is the largest section within Valley RFC with over 200 active members

Netball 
Valley RFC currently has 10 Netball teams competing throughout all divisions of the Hong Kong Netball Association. Valley RFC Netball is one of the most successful and decorated netball clubs in Hong Kong bringing home over 20 league trophies in the Senior Women's Competition. Because of our history and success, Valley Netball continues to be the most coveted club attracting over 150 players to our Women's League annual August trials.

Honours
 Hong Kong Men's Rugby Premiership
 Grand Final Champions: 1990, 1994, 1996, 2000, 2001, 2003, 2006, 2007, 2009, 2011, 2013, 2014, 2015, 2016, 2017, 2018
 League Champions: 1990, 1991, 1994, 1995, 1996, 1997, 1998, 1999, 2000, 2001, 2002, 2003, 2009, 2010, 2016, 2017

Hong Kong Women's Rugby Premiership
 Grand Final Champions: 1994, 1996, 1997, 2008, 2010, 2011, 2012, 2015, 2016, 2017, 2019, 2020
 League Champions: 2008, 2009, 2010, 2011, 2012, 2015, 2016, 2017, 2020

2020-2021 Men's Premiership Rugby Squad 
in bold = international players

Notable former players 
 Rambo Leung - Hong Kong international.
 Matthew Deayton - Hong Kong international.
 Rodney McIntosh - Hong Kong international and New Zealand Maori
 Isi Tui'vai - Hong Kong and Tongan international
 Keith Lowen - New Zealand All Black
 Vaughan Going - Hong Kong international, New Zealand U20 and former Top14 and English Premiership player
 Stuart Krohn - Hong Kong international and Stade Toulousain player.
 Robin Bredbury - Hong Kong international.
 Owen Sussex - Hong Kong international
 Mark Ashall - Hong Kong international.
 Dean Herewini - Hong Kong international
 Alex Telea - Western Samoa international
 Matthew Dowling - New South Wales Waratahs
 Andrew Wongkee - Hong Kong international
 Terence Montgomery - Hong Kong international.
 Grant Livingston - former London Scottish player.
 Salom Yiu - Hong Kong international.
 Jack Bennett - Hong Kong international.
 Kirk Munro - Hong Kong international.
 Justin Temara - Hong Kong international.
 Andrew Kelly - former Edinburgh Rugby player. Scotland A. international.
 Alex Baddeley - Hong Kong international.
 Dave Vainqueur - former Top14 player
 Adam Rolston - Hong Kong international.
 Ed Rolston - former Leicester Tigers player and Hong Kong international.
 Max Woodward - Hong Kong international (Union and Sevens).
 Ryan Meacham - Hong Kong international (Union and Sevens).
 Nicholas Hewson - Hong Kong international and captain (XV's and VII's). Hong Kong's most capped XV's player.
 Harry Sayers - Hong Kong international
 Paul Altier - Hong Kong international
 Matthew Rosslee - Hong Kong international
 Tau Koloamatangi - Hong Kong international and former New Zealand U20
 Ben Higgins - Hong Kong international

References

Hong Kong rugby union teams